Trigonopterus parasumbawensis is a species of flightless weevil in the genus Trigonopterus from Indonesia.

Etymology
The specific name is derived from the Greek word para-, meaning "next to" or "beside", combined with the specific name of the related species T. sumbawensis.

Description
Individuals measure 1.56–1.90 mm in length.  General coloration is black, with dark rust-colored elytra and rust-colored antennae, tibiae, and tarsi.

Range

Phylogeny
T. parasumbawensis is part of the T. relictus species group.

References

parasumbawensis
Beetles described in 2014
Beetles of Asia
Insects of Indonesia